The FC Basel 1938–39 season was the forty-sixth season since the club's foundation on 15 November 1893. FC Basel played their home games in the Landhof in the district Wettstein in Kleinbasel. Emil Junker was the club chairman and it was his third consecutive season as club president. The club had financial and sporting problems over the previous few years and these continued this season.

Overview 
According to statements in the 75th anniversary book written years later by author Jules Düblin (ex-player and ex-club chairman) the club had problems with the Swiss Football Association (SFA). The club was also having financial problems and these problems continued this season. The club suffered under the results of this confrontation with the SFA. These were mainly due to the transfer of the player Numa Monnard, who at the start of the season returned to his former club Cantonal Neuchatel.

Fernand Jaccard who had been Basel's player-manager the previous season, continued for the club in the same position this season. Basel played a total of 29 matches in their 1938–39 season. 22 of these matches were in the Nationalliga, two in the Swiss Cup and five were friendly matches. Of these five friendlies two were played at home in the Landhof and the other three were also in Switzerland. Two friendly games were won, two drawn and one ended in a defeat.

12 teams contested the 1938–39 Nationalliga championship, which was played as a round-robin, one team to be relegated. Despite the fact that the players were well prepared for the season, as Düblin wrote in his summary, sportingly the season was very bad. Despite two victories over the two top clubs that season, Grasshopper Club and Grenchen, one catastrophic game followed the other. Of the 22 domestic league games only five ended with a win, 12 were defeats. The team ended in last position, two points behind Biel-Bienne and the Young Boys. Basel was relegated for the first time in the club history into the newly reorganized 1.Liga.

In the first principal round of the Swiss Cup Basel were drawn at home against lower tier local rivals Concordia Basel and won 3–2. In the second round Basel were also drawn at home against a lower-tier team, but Brühl St. Gallen proved to be a strong competitor and Basel were defeated 1–3. and were thrown out of the competition.

Players 
The following is the list of the Basel first team squad during the season 1938–39. The list includes players that were in the squad the day the season started on 24 July 1938 but subsequently left the club after that date.

 
 
 

 

Players who left the squad

Results

Legend

Friendly matches

Pre-season

Mid-season

Nationalliga

League matches

League table

Swiss Cup

See also 
 History of FC Basel
 List of FC Basel players
 List of FC Basel seasons

References

Sources 
 Rotblau: Jahrbuch Saison 2014/2015. Publisher: FC Basel Marketing AG. 
 Die ersten 125 Jahre. Publisher: Josef Zindel im Friedrich Reinhardt Verlag, Basel. 
 FCB team 1938/39 at fcb-archiv.ch
 Switzerland 1938/39 by Erik Garin at Rec.Sport.Soccer Statistics Foundation

External links
 FC Basel official site

FC Basel seasons
Basel